Tina Hermann (born 5 March 1992) is a German skeleton racer and a four-time World champion. She began racing in 2007 and was selected to the national team in 2009. She is coached by Dirk Matschenz (personal) and Jens Müller (national); away from the track, she is a police officer.

Notable results
Hermann's first competition on the Europe Cup circuit was at Winterberg in the 2008–09 season, where she finished seventh. Hermann won the Junior World Championships in the 2009–10 season at St. Moritz, but did not record a victory on the Europe Cup until 2011–12 at Altenberg. She began racing on the Intercontinental Cup circuit in 2012–13 and had her first ICC gold that season, also in Altenberg. After a second season on the ICC, Hermann was promoted to the World Cup squad for the 2014–15 season, during which she never finished lower than sixth place.

Hermann has finished every World Cup season top-three in the overall rankings: third in 2014–15, first in 2015–16, and second in 2016–17. In her Crystal Globe-winning 2015–16 season, Hermann took home five golds (at Winterberg, Park City, Whistler, and twice at Königssee) and two silvers (at Altenberg and St. Moritz), with only one result off the podium (fourth in Lake Placid). She had one gold in the 2016–17 season, at Igls.

In European Championships, Hermann placed second in 2015–16 at St. Moritz and third in 2016–17 at Winterberg. Her first podium at the World Championships was in the mixed team event at Winterberg in 2015, where individually she finished fifth. She was again on a gold-medal-winning squad in the mixed team at Igls the following year, where she also won the individual gold. At the 2017 World Championships in Königssee, Hermann earned silvers in both disciplines.

World Cup results
All results are sourced from the International Bobsleigh and Skeleton Federation (IBSF).

References

External links

1992 births
Living people
German female skeleton racers
Skeleton racers at the 2018 Winter Olympics
Skeleton racers at the 2022 Winter Olympics
Olympic skeleton racers of Germany
Sportspeople from Cologne
21st-century German women